Georges Boco (born 17 May 1963) is a Beninese former professional boxer. As an amateur, he competed in the men's welterweight event at the 1984 Summer Olympics.

References

External links
 

1963 births
Living people
Beninese male boxers
Olympic boxers of Benin
Boxers at the 1984 Summer Olympics
People from Cotonou
Welterweight boxers
African Boxing Union champions
Middleweight boxers